Kao Shien-quey is a Taiwanese politician. She has served as the Deputy Minister of National Development Council since 20 May 2016.

Education
Kao obtained her bachelor's and master's degree in economics from National Taiwan University.

References

Living people
Political office-holders in the Republic of China on Taiwan
Year of birth missing (living people)